Espenschied may refer to:

 Dragan Espenschied (born 1975), German 8-bit musician and media artist
 Lloyd Espenschied (1889–1986), American electrical engineer
 Espenschied, subdivision of Lorch, Hesse

See also 
 Espenschied Nunatak, mountain in Antarctica